Francis Clinton "Clint" Rogge (July 19, 1889 – January 6, 1969) was a professional baseball pitcher.

External links

1889 births
1969 deaths
Adrian Bulldogs baseball players
Pittsburgh Rebels players
Cincinnati Reds players
Major League Baseball pitchers
Baseball players from Michigan
Battle Creek Crickets players
Dubuque Hustlers players
Des Moines Boosters players
Toronto Maple Leafs (International League) players
Indianapolis Indians players
Columbus Senators players